Malcolm Jamaine Johnson (born August 11, 1992) is a former American football fullback. He played college football at Mississippi State and was drafted by the Cleveland Browns in the sixth round of the 2015 NFL Draft. He has also been a member of the Seattle Seahawks and the San Francisco 49ers.

Early life and high school career
Malcolm Johnson was born August 11, 1992, to James and Genesis Johnson. He was raised in Tuscaloosa, Alabama.

He enrolled at Northridge High School in Tuscaloosa, where he was a standout basketball player in his sophomore (2007–2008) and junior (2008–2009) years. But his best sport was football, where he played both tight end and wide receiver.

Both Rivals.com and ESPN ranked him as a three-star prospect (out of four star). ESPN ranked him the 75th best high school wide receiver in the nation, and Rivals.com ranked him the 33rd best college recruit in the state of Alabama regardless of position. He participated in the Rivals.com football recruiting camps in Birmingham, Alabama, and Atlanta, Georgia, and received Most Valuable Player honors at each camp. After graduating from high school, he committed to play at Mississippi State University in July 2009.

College career
Johnson was redshirted at Mississippi State, attending classes, practicing with the football team, and dressing for play but not competing in games.

Beginning with his second year, Johnson was a starter for Mississippi State at tight end. His role on the team was not a traditional one, as he often played the role of a wingback or slotback. He started in 11 of the team's 12 games that year, but did not catch a pass until the sixth game of the season. In his second game, he had a season-high  receiving yards, and in his third caught a season-high three passes (including one for a touchdown). His career-best catch of  came in the Music City Bowl on December 30.

Johnson suffered a torn pectoral muscle during pre-season practice in August 2012, which caused him to miss the first five games. He started in the last eight games of the season, and in his season debut game against the Tennessee Volunteers he made a one-handed touchdown reception on fourth-and-goal with nine seconds left to win the game.

In his senior year in the 2013 season, Johnson started the year with an undisclosed injury he received in training camp. He had the third most receiving yards for Mississippi State that year, and was tied for second on the team with 19 receptions for first downs. He had a college-career longest reception of  against the Kentucky Wildcats on October 24, his first touchdown reception of the year. He was named to the All-SEC second-team for his efforts.

As a fifth-year senior in the 2014 season, Johnson was named team co-captain, and played in all 13 games (starting in 12 of them). Defeating Auburn, then the second-ranked team in the nation, propelled Mississippi State to number one in the Associated Press coaches football poll. The team went from unranked to Number 1 in just five weeks, the fastest rise in the poll's history. His efforts on the field won him a position on the All-SEC second-team once more.

By the end of his college career, Johnson had played in 45 games, 23 of them as a starter.

Johnson received his bachelor's degree from Mississippi State in December 2014. He then enrolled in a master's degree in workforce education, with an expected graduation date of May 2015.

Professional career

Cleveland Browns
Sportswriter Joel A. Erickson, writing in The Birmingham News in September 2013, called Johnson's college career "somewhat spotty", noting that his best year for receptions was his first year. Amid worries that he might not be picked at all, Johnson was drafted by the Cleveland Browns in the sixth round of the 2015 NFL Draft. He was the first tight end from Mississippi State to be drafted since Donald Lee in 2003.

On May 11, 2015, Johnson signed a four-year contract with the Browns worth $2.39 million. He played in 12 regular season games as a fullback that fall, starting five, and had no rushing attempts but caught four passes for 15 yards. The following season, he played in seven games, starting one, had one run for two yards but fumbled, and caught five passes for 44 yards. Johnson was waived by the Browns on October 24, 2016.

Seattle Seahawks
On November 23, 2016, Johnson was signed to the Seattle Seahawks' practice squad. He was released on November 29, 2016. He was re-signed on December 20, 2016. He signed a reserve/future contract with the Seahawks on January 16, 2017.

On May 11, 2017, Johnson was waived/injured by the Seahawks and placed on injured reserve. He was waived from injured reserve on June 19, 2017.

San Francisco 49ers
On January 2, 2018, Johnson signed a reserve/future contract with the San Francisco 49ers. He was waived on September 1, 2018.

Green Bay Packers
On November 28, 2018, Johnson was signed to the Green Bay Packers practice squad. He signed a reserve/future contract with the Packers on December 31, 2018. On August 31, 2019, he was placed on injured reserve.

NFL career statistics

Regular season

References

External links

Mississippi State Bulldogs bio

1992 births
Living people
Sportspeople from Tuscaloosa, Alabama
Players of American football from Alabama
American football fullbacks
American football tight ends
Mississippi State Bulldogs football players
Cleveland Browns players
Seattle Seahawks players
San Francisco 49ers players
Green Bay Packers players